Acantholiparis is a genus of marine ray-finned fishes belongong to the family Liparidae, the snailfishes. These fishes are found in the northern Pacific Ocean.

Species
Acantholiparis currently contains two recognized species:
 Acantholiparis caecus Grinols, 1969 (blind snailfish)
 Acantholiparis opercularis C. H. Gilbert & Burke, 1912 (spiny snailfish)

References

Liparidae
 
Taxa named by Charles Henry Gilbert